Brian Wilbert Gayle (born 6 March 1965) is an English former professional footballer who played as a central defender.

Gayle began his career at Wimbledon as an apprentice, signing a full contract in October 1984. He spent time with New Zealand club Napier City Rovers before breaking into the first team. He helped Wimbledon to the sixth round of the 1987–88 FA Cup, which the club ultimately won, but was given a red card for a foul on Malcolm Allen in the match, against Watford, and did not feature in later rounds. In July 1988, Gayle joined Manchester City for £325,000.

He was transferred to Ipswich Town for £330,000 in January 1990, and then joined Sheffield United in a £750,000 deal in September 1991. While at the Blades, in 1992, Gayle scored an own goal in a match against local rivals Leeds United, which led to a 2–3 defeat. This, coupled with Manchester United losing to Liverpool, gave Leeds the First Division title.

References

1965 births
Living people
English footballers
Association football central defenders
Wimbledon F.C. players
Manchester City F.C. players
Ipswich Town F.C. players
Sheffield United F.C. players
Exeter City F.C. players
Rotherham United F.C. players
Bristol Rovers F.C. players
Shrewsbury Town F.C. players
Telford United F.C. players
Premier League players
Napier City Rovers FC players